William Douglas "D. J." Mitchell Jr. (born May 13, 1987) is an American former professional baseball pitcher. He played in Major League Baseball for the New York Yankees in 2012. Before embarking on his professional career, he played college baseball at Clemson University.

Amateur career
Mitchell graduated from North Forsyth High School in Winston-Salem, North Carolina, and attended Clemson University, where he played college baseball with the Clemson Tigers baseball team in the Atlantic Coast Conference (ACC) of the National Collegiate Athletic Association's Division I. In 2006, Mitchell's freshman year, he played as a right fielder. Mitchell began to pitch in 2007, his sophomore year at Clemson. After Clemson's 2007 season concluded, Mitchell pitched for the Bourne Braves of the Cape Cod Baseball League (CCBL), a collegiate summer baseball league. He led the CCBL in strikeouts, earning him recognition in Sports Illustrateds Faces in the Crowd feature. By 2008, Mitchell played exclusively as a pitcher, and he was named First Team All-ACC.

Professional career

New York Yankees
The New York Yankees drafted Mitchell in the 10th round, 320th overall, of the 2008 Major League Baseball Draft. Making his professional debut in 2009, he had a 1.95 earned run average (ERA) with the Charleston RiverDogs of the Class A South Atlantic League and a 2.87 ERA with the Tampa Yankees of the Class A-Advanced Florida State League.

Mitchell began the 2010 season with the Trenton Thunder of the Class AA Eastern League. On August 21, 2010, Mitchell was promoted from Trenton to the Class AAA Scranton/Wilkes-Barre Yankees of the International League. In 2011, Mitchell had a 13–9 win–loss record with a 3.18 ERA for Scranton/Wilkes-Barre. For this performance, Mitchell won the 2011 Yankees' Minor League "Pitcher of the Year" Award.

Mitchell was added to the Yankees 40-man roster after the 2011 season to protect him from the Rule 5 draft. Competing for the long reliever role with the Yankees in spring training in 2012, the Yankees chose David Phelps for the role, and Mitchell was optioned to Scranton/Wilkes-Barre.

On April 29, 2012, Mitchell was recalled to the Yankees after Freddy García was moved to the bullpen. David Phelps  was placed in the rotation, Cody Eppley was optioned to Scranton/Wilkes-Barre, and Mitchell took Phelps' role of long relief. He made his major league debut on May 1, 2012, against the Baltimore Orioles, striking out one in an inning of work, he made three more appearances with the Yankees.

Later career
The Yankees traded Mitchell and pitcher Danny Farquhar to the Seattle Mariners for Ichiro Suzuki on July 23, 2012. Mitchell was optioned to Triple-A Tacoma after the trade. On April 11, 2013, Mitchell was designated for assignment, after he cleared waivers, Mitchell opted for free agency. Mitchell signed a minor league contract with the New York Mets on April 22, 2013.

Mitchell signed with Bridgeport Bluefish of the Atlantic League of Professional Baseball for 2014 season, he re-signed with the Bluefish for the 2015 season. D.J. resigned with the Bluefish for the 2016 season, marking his 3rd consecutive season with the ballclub. On August 1, 2016, Mitchell was traded to the Long Island Ducks for former major league player Sean Burroughs. He became a free agent after the 2016 season.

References

External links

1987 births
Living people
New York Yankees players
Baseball players from Winston-Salem, North Carolina
Clemson Tigers baseball players
Major League Baseball pitchers
Bourne Braves players
Charleston RiverDogs players
Tampa Yankees players
Trenton Thunder players
Scranton/Wilkes-Barre Yankees players
Bridgeport Bluefish players
Tacoma Rainiers players
Las Vegas 51s players